Cedar Creek is a census-designated place in Gila County, Arizona, United States, on the Fort Apache Indian Reservation.  Cedar Creek  is located along Arizona State Route 73. The population in 2010 was 318.

Geography

Demographics

Transportation
The White Mountain Apache Tribe operates the Fort Apache Connection Transit, which provides local bus service.

References

Census-designated places in Gila County, Arizona
White Mountain Apache Tribe